"O Leãozinho" is a song composed by Brazilian singer/songwriter Caetano Veloso. The song title means "little lion" in Portuguese. It was recorded by Veloso himself in 1977 and published as the eighth track from his album Bicho (meaning "animal" or "bug" in Portuguese). English lyrics were added by Meja in her 2004 Mellow, however keeping the original title in Portuguese.

Notable recordings
Caetano Veloso - Bicho (1977)
Vozes da Rádio - Mappa do Coração (1997)
Meja - Mellow (2004)
Jane Birkin & Caetano Veloso -  Rendez-Vous (2006)
Teresa Salgueiro - La Serena (2007)
Priscilla Ahn - Live Sessions EP (2008)
Beirut - Red Hot + Rio 2 (2011)
Mary Roos - Denk was du willst (2013)

See also
List of bossa nova standards

Brazilian songs
Caetano Veloso songs
Portuguese-language songs
1977 songs
Songs about mammals

References